Magdolna Hunyadfy (born 1 July 1937) is a Hungarian former swimmer. She competed in the women's 400 metre freestyle at the 1952 Summer Olympics.

References

1937 births
Living people
Hungarian female freestyle swimmers
Olympic swimmers of Hungary
Swimmers at the 1952 Summer Olympics
Swimmers from Budapest